Olga Maturana Espinosa (October 10, 1906 – July 16, 1973) was a Chilean politician born in Santiago. Maturana worked as Councillor of Pichilemu in 1950, and became the first female Mayor of Pichilemu in 1951.

Biography 
Maturana was born on October 10, 1906 in Santiago, Chile. Her parents were Arturo Maturana Zúñiga and Emma Espinosa Pedrada.

Maturana married in 1926 Felipe Iturriaga Esquivel in Santiago when he was 20. Maturana and Iturriaga moved to Pichilemu in 1932. Iturriaga was elected Mayor for three terms (1932–1935; 1941–1944; and 1956–1959), and Maturana was elected Councillor of Pichilemu in 1950, along with Carlos Echazarreta Larraín, Ricardo Ayala and Armando Caroca Rojas. Sergio Morales Retamal was elected Mayor, but he left the office in 1951.

Olga Maturana succeeded Sergio Morales on May 28, 1951, and became the first female Mayor of Pichilemu, as an independent. Her term ended on May 17, 1953.

Maturana had five children with her husband Felipe Iturriaga.

Maturana died on July 16, 1973 in Pichilemu, Chile at 66.

Influence 
As of 2008, only two women had occupied political offices in Pichilemu: Alicia López Galarce (Councillor from 1953 until 1956) and Olga Maturana.

In 2008, 12 women enrolled to the municipal election. Only three of them were eventually elected as councillors: Marta Urzúa, Andrea Aranda and Viviana Parraguez.

References 

1906 births
1973 deaths
People from Santiago
Mayors of Pichilemu
Women mayors of places in Chile
Independent politicians in Chile
20th-century Chilean women politicians
20th-century Chilean politicians